The 2023 Bangladeshi presidential election was scheduled for Sunday, 19 February 2023 to elect the 22nd President of Bangladesh. However, nominations closed at noon on 12 February and the Awami League politician Shahabuddin Chuppu, who had nominated in accordance with the provisions of the Constitution, was the only candidate nominated. On 13 February 2023, Shahabuddin was thus officially elected as the country's 22nd president as he was unopposed.

Chuppu will be inaugurated for a five-year term on Tuesday, 24 April 2023.

Background 
As the ruling party Bangladesh Awami League has the majority of seats in the Jatiya Sangsad, and the constitution restricts cross-voting, the candidate nominated by the party supposed to win the election. Besides, opposition parties had already declared that they won't nominate any candidate. Thus AL-nominated candidate Shahabuddin Chuppu won the election unopposed.

Electoral system 
The President is elected by an indirect election by the members of parliament as per Article 48 of the Constitution. However, since 1991, when parliamentary government system was restored in Bangladesh, all of government party candidates have been elected uncontestedly.

Electoral college

Aftermath

Responses

National

Political parties 
Bangladesh Nationalist Party-BNP had already expressed their disinterest in the election, as they were already protesting for the resignation of the Hasina-led government.

Before the election, parliamentary main opposition party Jatiya Party-JaPa (Ershad) had said that they won't nominate any candidate for the election.

As Chuppu was nominated for the election, JaPa's chairman Ghulam Muhammed Quader welcomed him and hoped that "he would discharge the duty with sincerity for betterment of the country and the nation." About the responses by others, he said, "The parties which are raising questions about the election, have they not seen the constitution? It is clearly said in the constitution that the party with majority can elect the president. Awami League has majority in the Parliament. They can constitutionally elect the President."

Although, there were mixed reactions form leftist political parties.

International

Organizations 
 United Nations: The national chapter of the UN congratulated Chuppu for being appointed for the post of President of the republic in a press release on 14 February. On the statement the organization also hoped that "the UN will extend its partnership with Bangladesh under his leadership to achieve Bangladesh's commitments towards implementing the SDGs and the UN charter".

Nations 
 :
 :
 : Russian President Vladimir Putin's congratulation message to Chuppu was released by the Russian Embassy in Dhaka on 28 February.
 :
 :

Inauguration

Notes

References

Presidential
2023 elections in Asia
Presidential election
2023
Uncontested elections